Terminator may refer to:

Science and technology

Genetics
 Terminator (genetics), the end of a gene for transcription
 Terminator technology, proposed methods for restricting the use of genetically modified plants by causing second generation seeds to be sterile

Astronomy
 Terminator (solar), a moving line that separates the illuminated side and the dark side of a planetary body
 The lunar terminator, specifically

Electronics and computers
 Terminator (electrical), a resistor at the end of a transmission line to prevent signal reflection
 Microsoft Terminator, a program analyzer research project
 Terminator (terminal emulator), a cross-platform GPL terminal emulator
 Statement terminator, used to demarcate the end of an individual statement in a programming language

Military
 BMPT Ob'yekt 199 Ramka, armoured tracked vehicle, designed for tanks support, often nicknamed "Terminator"
 Sukhoi Su-37 Air Superiority Fighter, also called the "Terminator".

Entertainment

Films and television
 Terminator (franchise), a series of science fiction films and derivative works, starring Arnold Schwarzenegger
 The Terminator, a 1984 film by James Cameron that began the franchise
 Terminator: Dark Fate, a 2019 film
 Terminator: The Sarah Connor Chronicles, a 2008 TV series 
 Terminator (character), a Terminator cyborg portrayed by Arnold Schwarzenegger
 Terminator (character concept), a fictional class of autonomous killer robots in the franchise
 The Terminators (film), a 2009 mockbuster distributed by The Asylum
 Terminator, an elimination gameplay element in the game show Greed

Music
 The Terminator (soundtrack), for the 1984 film
 "Terminator" (1988), song by metal band Powermad
 "Terminator" (1992 track), darkcore track by Goldie
 "Terminator" (1997), song by Sevendust from the album Sevendust

Games
 Terminator (Warhammer 40,000), a type of Space Marine in the Warhammer 40,000 setting
 Many video games based on the 1984 franchise; see List of Terminator video games

Comics 
 Terminator (DC Comics) or Deathstroke, a DC comic book supervillain
 Terminator (Marvel Comics), a Space Knight character in Marvel Comics
 Many works based on the 1984 franchise; see List of Terminator comics

Other entertainment
 Nikki Terminator, robot assistant of magician Rudy Coby
 Terminator, a moving city at the edge of light and dark in the planet Mercury, in Kim Stanley Robinson's novels and short stories

People
 The Terminator (wrestler) (born 1964), American professional wrestler 
 Arbi Barayev (born 1974–2001), Chechen warlord
 Niels Feijen, (born 1977), Dutch pool player 
 Bosco Ntaganda (born c. 1973), Congolese militia leader and war criminal 
 Anatoly Onoprienko (1959–2013), Ukrainian serial killer
 Tom Henke, an American baseball player
 Ariarne Titmus (born 2000), Australian swimmer
Hermann Maier (born 1972), nicknamed "Herminator"

Other uses
 Terminator, a cryptonym for the 2003-2004 Ford Mustang SVT Cobra pony car
 Nike Terminator, a high-top shoe by Nike

See also
 Terminaator, Estonian band
 Terminonatator, a plesiosaur genus
 Termination (disambiguation)
 Terminatrix (disambiguation)
 Terminus (disambiguation)
 Exterminator (disambiguation)